Saaristo is a Finnish surname. Notable people with the surname include:

Anneli Saaristo (born 1949), Finnish singer and actress
Julius Saaristo (1891–1969), Finnish track athlete
Michael Saaristo (1938–2008), Finnish arachnologist
 

Finnish-language surnames